Dragoš (1290s) was a magnate in the service of Serbian King Stefan Milutin (r. 1282–1321), with the title of veliki župan. His origin is unknown. After Stefan Milutin defeated Despot Shishman of Vidin and the Tatars, peace was agreed, Shishman was reinstated and Dragoš's daughter was married to Shishman.

Dragoš and veliki vojvoda Novak Grebostrek are the only nobility mentioned in Danilo II's Život kraljeva i arhiepiskopa srpskih (1337–40).

References

14th-century Serbian nobility
People of the Kingdom of Serbia (medieval)
Medieval Serbian magnates